Gozar (also Romanized as Gozār; also known as Gazdār and Gaz̄z̄ār) is a village in Firuzeh Rural District, in the Central District of Firuzeh County, Razavi Khorasan Province, Iran. At the 2006 census, its population was 54, in 17 families.

References 

Populated places in Firuzeh County